Devojka od čokolade is the second studio album by Serbian recording artist Ana Nikolić. It was released in 2006 by City Records, and most of its songs were written by Aleksandar Milić Mili, Ljiljana Jorgovanović and Marina Tucaković, who worked on Nikolić's debut release Januar from 2003. The album became one of the fastest-selling in the region and its most notable single was "Romale Romali", that Ana sang on Beovizija in 2006 and was written by Kiki Lesendrić. Video for the main title song of the album won the audience sympathies immediately and so did the ballad “Plakaćete za mnom oboje” as well as songs “Dum jedan konjak”, “Klovn”, “Verna do kolena”.

Track listing

References

2006 albums
Ana Nikolić albums